The Desert Column was a First World War British Empire army corps which operated in the Sinai and Palestine Campaign from 22 December 1916. The Column was commanded by Lieutenant General Philip W. Chetwode and formed part of Eastern Force. When Chetwode took command of Eastern Force after the Second Battle of Gaza, Harry Chauvel took command and oversaw the expansion of the column to three divisions.

Chetwode was appointed on 7 December 1916 to command the Column which was composed of the 42nd (East Lancashire) Division, the 52nd (Lowland) Division, the Anzac Mounted Division and the Imperial Camel Brigade's eighteen companies, six of which were yeomen. These divisions had been involved in the Battle of Romani in August 1916 and had advanced across the Sinai Peninsula. Chetwode arrived at El Arish to take up his appointment on 22 December 1916. The Battle of Magdhaba was won the next day, and on 9 January 1917 the Battle of Rafa was also won by the Desert Column, before two defeats were suffered during the First and Second battles for Gaza in March and April 1917.

In mid 1917 when General Edmund Allenby took command of the Egyptian Expeditionary Force, Desert Column was renamed to become the Desert Mounted Corps commanded by Lieutenant General Chauvel.

December 1916 
Desert Column Headquarters El Arish (Lieutenant General Sir Philip Chetwode)
42nd (East Lancashire) Division
125th (Lancashire Fusiliers) Brigade
126th (East Lancashire) Brigade
127th (Manchester) Brigade
52nd (Lowland) Division (Major General W.E.B. Smith)
155th (South Scottish) Brigade
156th (Scottish Rifles) Brigade
157th (Highland Light Infantry) Brigade
Anzac Mounted Division (Major General Harry Chauvel)
1st Light Horse Brigade
2nd Light Horse Brigade
3rd Light Horse Brigade
New Zealand Mounted Rifles Brigade
Imperial Camel Corps Brigade

Royal Flying Corps 5th Wing stationed at Mustabig (Lieutenant Colonel W.G.H Salmond)
No. 14 (British) Squadron
(No. 17 Squadron)
No. 1 Squadron Australian Flying Corps / No. 67 (Australian) Squadron

Order of Battle 9 January 1917 

Desert Column (Lieutenant General Chetwode)
Anzac Mounted Division (Major General Chauvel)
1st Light Horse Brigade (Brigadier General C. F. Cox)
3rd Light Horse Brigade (Brigadier General J. R. Royston)
New Zealand Mounted Rifles Brigade (Brigadier General E. W. C. Chaytor)
Inverness, Leicestershire and Somerset Territorial Royal Horse Artillery batteries
Imperial Camel Corps Brigade
1st (Australian) Battalion
2nd (British) Battalion
3rd (Australian) Battalion
4th (Australian and New Zealand) Battalion
Hong Kong and Singapore Mountain Battery
5th Mounted Yeomanry Brigade
Honourable Artillery Company (18–pounder) Battery
No. 7 Light Car Patrol (six Ford cars equipped with machine guns)
No. 1 Squadron Australian Flying Corps
No. 14 Squadron Royal Flying Corps

Order of Battle March 1917 

Desert Column (Lieutenant General P. Chetwode)

53rd (Welsh) Division (Major General A.G. Dallas)
158th (North Wales) Brigade (Brigadier General H. A. Vernon)
1/5th (Flintshire) Battalion, Royal Welch Fusiliers
1/6th (Carnarvonshire & Anglesey) Battalion, Royal Welch Fusiliers
1/7th (Montgomery) Battalion, Royal Welch Fusiliers
1/1st Battalion, Herefordshire Regiment
158th Brigade Machine Gun Company
159th (Cheshire) Brigade (Brigadier General N. Money)
1/4th Battalion, Cheshire Regiment
1/7th Battalion, Cheshire Regiment
1/4th Battalion, Welch Regiment
1/5th Battalion Welch Regiment
159th Brigade Machine Gun Company
160th (Welsh Border) Brigade  (Brigadier General V. L. N. Pearson)
2/4th Battalion, Queen's Royal Regiment (West Surrey)
1/4th Battalion, Royal Sussex Regiment
2/4th Battalion, Royal West Kent Regiment
2/10th Battalion, Middlesex Regiment
160th Brigade Machine Gun Company

Anzac Mounted Division (Major General H. G. Chauvel)
2nd Australian Light Horse Brigade (Brigadier General G. de L. Ryrie)
5th, 6th, 7th Australian Light Horse Regiments
New Zealand Mounted Rifle Brigade (Brigadier General E. W. C. Chaytor)
Auckland, Canterbury and Wellington Mounted Rifle Regiments
22nd Mounted Brigade (Brigadier General F. A. B. Fryer)
Stafford, 1/1st Lincolnshire Yeomanry, Sherwood Rangers Yeomanry/East Riding Yeomanry

Imperial Mounted Division (Major General H.W. Hodgson)
3rd Australian Light Horse Brigade (Brigadier General L. C. Wilson)
8th, 9th, 10th Australian Light Horse Regiments
5th Mounted Brigade (Brigadier General Percy Desmond FitzGerald)
6th Mounted Brigade (Brigadier General C A C. Godwin)
Queen's Own Dorset Yeomanry, Buckinghamshire Yeomanry and Berkshire Yeomanry

Artillery
Anzac Mounted Division 4 Batteries RHA of 4 18–pdrs = 16 guns
Imperial Mounted Division 4 Batteries RHA of 4 18–pdrs = 16 guns
Imperial Camel Brigade 1 Camel Pack Battery of 6 2.75-inch = 6 guns
53rd (Welsh) Division (3 Brigades RFA 12 18–pdrs=24 guns) 4 of each battery only = 16 guns; 4 4.5-inch howitzers = 8 howitzer
54th (East Anglian) Division (3 Brigades RFA 12 18–pdrs=24 guns) 4 of each battery only = 16 guns; 4 4.5-inch howitzers = 8 howitzer
Army Troops (3 Batteries of 4 60–pdrs=12 guns) one section only = 6 guns

Order of Battle April 1917 
General Headquarters Commander in Chief Lieutenant General (temp. General) A. J. Murray
Eastern Force GOC Major General (temp. Lieutenant General C. M. Dobell Brigadier General General Staff Brevet Lieutenant Colonel (temp. Brigadier General G. P. Dawnay

Desert Column
GOC Major General (temp. Lieutenant General P. W. Chetwode
Anzac Mounted Division GOC Colonel (temp. Major General) H. G. Chauvel
1st Australian Light Horse Brigade [Anzac Mounted Division] GOC Lieutenant Colonel C. F. Cox
1st Light Horse Regiment
2nd Light Horse Regiment
3rd Light Horse Regiment
1st Australian Light Horse Signal Troop
1st Australian Machine Gun Squadron
2nd Australian Light Horse Brigade GOC Colonel (temp. Brigadier General G. de L. Ryrie
5th Light Horse Regiment
6th Light Horse Regiment
7th Light Horse Regiment
2nd Australian Light Horse Signal Troop
2nd Australian Machine Gun Squadron
New Zealand Mounted Rifles Brigade GOC Brigadier General E. W. C. Chaytor)
Auckland Mounted Rifle Regiment
Canterbury Mounted Rifle Regiment
Wellington Mounted Rifle Regiment
New Zealand Mounted Rifles Signal Troop
New Zealand Machine Gun Squadron
22nd Mounted Brigade GOC Colonel (temp. Brigadier General) F. A. B. Fryer
1/1st Lincolnshire Yeomanry
1/1st Staffordshire Yeomanry
1/1st East Riding Yeomanry
22nd Mounted Brigade Signal Troop
18th Machine Gun Squadron
Divisional Troops same as April 1916 oob except
batteries not brigaded
Mounted Divisional Ammunition Column added
Nos 26 and 27 Australian Units of Supply substituted for Light Horse Supply Column
1/1st North Midland Mounted Brigade Field Ambulance substituted for 3rd Light Horse Field Ambulance

Imperial Mounted Division GOC Colonel (temp. Major General) H. W. Hodgson
3rd Light Horse Brigade GOC Colonel (temp. Brigadier General) J. R. Royston
8th Light Horse Regiment
9th Light Horse Regiment
10th  Light Horse Regiment
3rd Australian Light Horse Signal Troop
3rd Australian Machine Gun Squadron
4th Light Horse Brigade GOC Lieutenant Colonel (temp. Brigadier General J. B. Meredith
4th Light Horse Regiment
11th Light Horse Regiment
12th Light Horse Regiment
4th Australian Light Horse Signal Troop
4th Australian Machine Gun Squadron
5th Mounted Brigade GOC Colonel (temp. Brigadier General) E. A. Wiggin
1/1st Warwick Yeomanry
1/1st Gloucester Yeomanry
1/1st Worcester Yeomanry
5th Mounted Signal Brigade Troop
16th Machine Gun Squadron
6th Mounted Brigade GOC Lieutenant Colonel (temp. Brigadier General) T. M. S. Pitt
1/1st Buckinghamshire Yeomanry
1/1st Berkshire Yeomanry
1/1st Dorsetshire Yeomanry
6th Brigade Signal Troop
17th Machine Gun Squadron
Divisional Troops
Artillery
1/1st Nottinghamshire and 1/1st Berkshire Batteries RHA
"A" and "B" Batteries, H.A.C.
Mounted Divisional Ammunition Column
Engineers
Imperial Mounted Division Field Squadron
Signal Service
Imperial Mounted Division Signal Squadron
ASC (unidentified)
Medical Units
3rd and 4th Light Horse, 1/1st and 1/2nd South Midland Mounted Brigades Field Ambulances.

Notes 
 Notes

 Citations

References 

 
 
 
 
 
 
 
 
 
 
 
 

World War I orders of battle
Expeditionary units and formations
Commands of the British Army
Military units and formations of the British Army in World War I
Egypt in World War I
Military units and formations established in 1916
Military units and formations disestablished in 1917